Seonamhaeicola acroporae is a Gram-negative, strictly aerobic and non-motile bacterium from the genus of Seonamhaeicola which has been isolated from the coral Acropora formosa from Japan.

References

Flavobacteria
Bacteria described in 2020